The 2019 Premiership Rugby Sevens Series will be the ninth rugby union sevens competition for the twelve clubs who compete in the 2019–20 Premiership Rugby clubs. It was also the third to feature the new format in which all twelve Premiership Rugby teams feature together in one venue over two days.

The competition would be held at Franklin's Gardens, Northampton for the third successive year on 13 and 14 September 2019.

Format
The twelve teams were split into four groups – A, B, C & D. Each team in the group played each other once, to World Rugby Laws of the Game – 7s Variations. 
Based on the result, teams received:
 4 points for a win
 2 points for a draw
 1 bonus point for a loss by seven points or less
 1 bonus point for scoring four or more tries in a match

Following all matches in each group, the winner and runner-up in each group progressed to the quarter-finals. The winners of each quarter-final qualified for the cup semi-finals, with the losers eliminated. Thereafter, competition was a simple knockout bracket, with the winner of the cup final being declared the series winner. The third placed team in each pool compete in the plate competition.

Group stage

Date: Friday, 13 September 2019

Group A

Group B

Group C

Group D

Finals stage
Finals day was played on Saturday, 14 September 2019.

The four pool winners played a quarter-final against the runners-up in a 1 v 8, 2 v 7, 3 v 6 4 v 5 format. The winner of these quarter-finals competed in the cup competition, while the losers were eliminated. The third placed team in each pool competed in the plate competition.

Quarter-finals

Plate competition

Plate semi-finals

Plate final

Cup competition

Semi-finals

Final

References

2019
Sevens
2019 rugby sevens competitions